Ahlafors IF is a Swedish football club located in Nödinge-Nol in Ale Municipality, Västra Götaland County.

Background
Ahlafors Idrottsförening were founded in 1913 and currently have around 800 members. Ahlafors IF manage Furulundsparken, a cosy folk park with a nostalgic feel, where the club arranges many dances and parties. In 2007 the club constructed a brand new miniature golf course, assisted by the former Swedish national golf player, Lars Albinsson.

Since their foundation Ahlafors IF has participated mainly in the middle and lower divisions of the Swedish football league system.  The club currently (2017) plays in Division 3 Nordvästra Götaland which is the fifth tier of Swedish football. They play their home matches at the Svenska Stenhus Arena 1 (Sjövallen) in Alafors, Nödinge-Nol.

Ahlafors IF are affiliated to Göteborgs Fotbollförbund.

Recent history
In recent seasons Ahlafors IF have competed in the following divisions:

2022 – Division II, Nordvästra Götaland 2021 – Division II, Nordvästra Götaland 2020 – Division III, Nordvästra Götaland 2019 – Division III, Nordvästra Götaland 2018 – Division III, Nordvästra Götaland 2017 – Division III, Nordvästra Götaland 2016 – Division III, Nordvästra Götaland 2015 – Division III, Nordvästra Götaland 2014 – Division III, Nordvästra Götaland 2013 – Division III, Nordvästra Götaland 2012 – Division III, Nordvästra Götaland 2011 – Division III, Nordvästra Götaland
2010 – Division III, Nordvästra Götaland
2009 – Division II, Västra Götaland
2008 – Division II, Västra Götaland
2007 – Division II, Västra Götaland
2006 – Division III, Nordvästra Götaland
2005 – Division IV, Göteborg A
2004 – Division V, Göteborg A
2003 – Division V, Göteborg A
2002 – Division VI, Göteborg A
2001 – Division V, Göteborg A
2000 – Division VI, Göteborg A
1999 – Division V, Göteborg A

Attendances

In recent seasons Ahlafors IF have had the following average attendances:

Footnotes

External links
 Ahlafors IF – Official website
 Ahlafors IF on Facebook

Football clubs in Gothenburg
Association football clubs established in 1913
1913 establishments in Sweden
Football clubs in Västra Götaland County